Hiromori is a masculine Japanese given name. Notable people with the name include:

, Japanese composer
, Japanese baseball commissioner

Japanese masculine given names